The Big Chill Super Chargers is a basketball team currently playing in the PBA Developmental League and is owned by Agri Nurture, Inc. The team also played for the Philippine Basketball League as the FCA Cultivators for the league's 2010 season.

Finals stint
Big Chill finished runner-up to NLEX Road Warriors twice, during the 2011-12 PBA D-League Foundation Cup  and the 2013-14 Aspirants Cup.

Roster list (2011-present)
Jeckster Apinan
Juneric Baloria
Rodney Brondial
Mark Angelo Canlas #9
Reil Cervantes
Jesse James Collado #29
Jopher Custodio #26
June Dizon #4
Jerry Glorioso #8
Brian Heruela
Keith Jensen #32
Janus Lozada #24
John Dexter Maiquez #11
Alex Mallari #11
Rafael Mangahas #9
Jefferson Morillo #5
Terrence Romeo #7
Allan Santos #12
Thomas Elliot Tan #6
Jess Mar Villahermosa

2010 PBL roster

Other people
 Assistant coaches: Jefferson Te, Freddie Tanlo, Paul Li 
 Team Owner: Mr.Antonio Tiu
 Board Representative: Mr.James Tiu
 Team Manager: Mr.Roman Ong

References

External links
Agri Nurture Inc. Official website
BigChill Superchargers PBA DLeague website
Bigchill.com.ph-The Big Chill
www.gameface.ph/mypbl

Former Philippine Basketball League teams
PBA Developmental League teams